CMA3 may refer to:

Rivière Saint-Maurice (Aviation Maurice) Water Aerodrome, a defunct Canadian aerodrome
2021 United Nations Climate Change Conference